Wang Sidong (born 23 September 1993) is a Chinese bobsledder. He competed in the two-man event at the 2018 Winter Olympics.

References

1993 births
Living people
Chinese male bobsledders
Olympic bobsledders of China
Bobsledders at the 2018 Winter Olympics
Place of birth missing (living people)